Ben Dayan is a surname. Notable people with the surname include:

Ali Ben Dayan (born 1943), Moroccan footballer
Dedi Ben Dayan (born 1978), Israeli footballer
Ortal Ben Dayan (born 1981), media personality, sociologist, and blogger

See also
Bendayan

Compound surnames